Slabodka Yeshiva is a branch of the Hebron Yeshiva in Bnei Brak, Israel, founded by Rabbi Yitzchak Isaac Sher.

A yeshiva (lit. "sitting"; pl. , yeshivot or yeshivos) is a Jewish institution that focuses on the study of traditional religious texts, primarily the Talmud and Torah study. Study is usually done through daily shiurim (lectures or classes) and in study pairs called ḥavrutas (Aramaic for "friendship" or "companionship").

The yeshiva has approximately 500 students; despite the Lithuanian affiliation of the yeshiva, many of the students are chassidic. Additionally, there are quite a few ultra-conservative followers of the Chazon Ish.

Leadership
Rabbi Sher was succeeded by his son-in-law, Rabbi Mordechai Shulman who is in turn succeeded by his son-in-law, Rabbi Moshe Hillel Hirsch.

Notable alumni
 Yehuda Amit
 Elimelech Biderman
 Yisroel Zvi Yoir Danziger of Aleksander
Moshe Gafni
Avrohom Genachowsky
 Yitzchak Dovid Grossman
 Chaim Kamil
David Landau
 Meir Porush
 Hillel Weinberg
 Amram Zaks
 Yitzchok Zilberstein

Roshei Yeshiva
 Dov Lando
 Moshe Hillel Hirsch
 Isaac Schwartz

References

Slabodka yeshiva
Haredi Judaism in Israel
Haredi yeshivas
Education in Israel
Orthodox yeshivas in Bnei Brak
Lithuanian-Jewish culture in Israel